Tridax is a genus of flowering plants in the family Asteraceae.

Tridax is native primarily to the tropical regions of North and South America. Tridax procumbens has become naturalized in the southern United States and is considered a noxious weed in some places. 

 Species

 formerly included
see Calea Layia Sabazia 
 Tridax accedens - Calea verticillata
 Tridax ehrenbergii  - Sabazia sarmentosa 
 Tridax gaillardioides  - Layia gaillardioides 
 Tridax verticillata  - Calea verticillata

References

Millerieae
Asteraceae genera
Taxa named by Carl Linnaeus